Raminea is a rural locality in the local government area (LGA) of Huon Valley in the South-east LGA region of Tasmania. The 2016 census recorded a population of 47 for the state suburb of Raminea.

History 
Raminea was gazetted as a locality in 1966. The name is believed to be an Aboriginal word for what is now called “Port Espérance”, the bay at the mouth of the Espérance River.

Geography
Almost all of the boundaries are ridgelines. The Espérance River flows through from north-west to south-east.

Road infrastructure 
Route A6 (Huon Highway) passes through the south-east corner of the locality.

References

Towns in Tasmania
Localities of Huon Valley Council